Donald Wayne Webb (born May 22, 1939) is a former American football defensive back. In 1961, he joined the Boston Patriots of the American Football League. He played for the Patriots for eleven seasons and was an AFL All-Star selection in 1969.  Webb returned a blocked punt 20 yards for a TD and returned an interception 31 yards for a TD in the Boston Patriots 41-0 shutout of the San Diego Chargers on 12-17-61.  He was selected to the Patriots All-1960s Decade (AFL) Team.

See also
 List of American Football League players

References

1939 births
Living people
American football defensive backs
Boston Patriots players
Iowa State Cyclones football players
New England Patriots players
American Football League All-Star players
Sportspeople from Jefferson City, Missouri
Players of American football from Missouri
American Football League players